Dark Hollow Run may refer to:

Dark Hollow Run (Ohio River tributary), in Hamilton County, Ohio, U.S.
Dark Hollow Run (Crooked Creek), in Indiana County, Pennsylvania, U.S.
Dark Hollow Run (Delaware River tributary), in Solebury Township, Bucks County, Pennsylvania, U.S.
Dark Hollow Run (Mud Pond Run), in Pike County, Pennsylvania, U.S.

See also
Dark Hollow (disambiguation)